The Albert Einstein International School (AEIS) in Amsterdam, The Netherlands, provides an international specialist education. The Albert Einstein International school is a comprehensive, co-educational  day  and boarding school  serving students between the ages of 2 and 18 years  from Pre-Kindergarten through Grade 12 with a campuses in Amsterdam, The Netherlands, Lviv, Ukraine and  Cambridge, MA, USA.

Academic programmes 

The Albert Einstein International School of Amsterdam is an independent specialist school, focused on Mathematics, Science, Languages and Art. Gifted and Talented Education (GATE) is an essential part of the program. The school is divided into four sections:

Study abroad programmes 

Study abroad programmes are part of the AEIS curriculum. 
 Science: London, England - history of Science or Oxford, England - Biology
 Humanities and Social Sciences: Scandinavia - Viking studies and medieval Literature
 Foreign Language and Culture: St. Petersburg, Russia or Lviv, Ukraine

Extra-Curricular activities 

After-school activities:

References 

International schools in Amsterdam